Academy Award (also listed as Academy Award Theater) is a CBS radio anthology series, which presented 30-minute adaptations of plays, novels, or films. 

Dramas in which actors recreated their original film roles included Henry Fonda in Young Mr. Lincoln, Humphrey Bogart in The Maltese Falcon, Cary Grant in Suspicion, Gregory Peck in The Keys of the Kingdom, and Ronald Colman in Lost Horizon. Only six actors recreated their own Oscar-winning roles: Fay Bainter, Bette Davis, Paul Lukas, Victor McLaglen, Paul Muni, and Ginger Rogers.

Format 

Rather than adaptations of Oscar-winning films, as the title implied, the series offered "Hollywood's finest, the great picture plays, the great actors and actresses, techniques and skills, chosen from the honor roll of those who have won or been nominated for the famous golden Oscar of the Academy of Motion Picture Arts and Sciences."

With that as a guideline, any drama could be presented as long as the cast included at least one Oscar-nominated performer. For example, Robert Nathan's 1940 novel Portrait of Jennie was not released as a film until 1949. David O. Selznick, having acquired the rights to Nathan's novel in 1944, was spending much time and money in his efforts to bring it to the screen. Thus, Academy Award'''s December 4, 1946, adaptation of Portrait of Jennie, with John Lund and Oscar-winner Joan Fontaine, had a promotional aspect, concluding with host/announcer Hugh Brundage revealing, "Portrait of Jennie is soon to be a Selznick International picture starring Jennifer Jones and Joseph Cotten."

 Production 

Frank Wilson scripted the 30-minute adaptations for producer-director Dee Englebach, and Leith Stevens provided the music. Frank Wilson was the script writer. The sound effects crew included Gene Twombly, Jay Roth, Clark Casey, and Berne Surrey.

 Broadcast 

The series began March 30, 1946, with Bette Davis, Anne Revere and Fay Bainter in Jezebel. On that first show, Jean Hersholt spoke as president of the Academy of Motion Picture Arts and Sciences, welcoming the E.R. Squibb & Sons pharmaceutical company {"The House Of Squibb"} as the program's sponsor. It was an expensive show to produce, since the stars cost $4000 a week, and another $1,600 went each week to the Academy of Motion Picture Arts and Sciences for the use of their name in the show's title. This eventually became a factor in Squibb's decision to cancel the series after only 39 weeks.

The program initially aired on Saturdays at 7 pm (ET) through June, then moved to Wednesdays at 10 pm. 

The series ended December 18, 1946, with Margaret O'Brien and one of the series' frequent supporting players, Jeff Chandler (appearing under his real name, Ira Grossel) in Lost Angel.

See alsoAuthor's PlayhouseThe Campbell PlayhouseCavalcade of AmericaThe CBS Radio WorkshopThe Cresta Blanca Hollywood PlayersFord TheatreGeneral Electric TheaterHollywood PlayhouseHollywood Star PlayhouseHollywood Star TimeLux Radio TheaterThe Mercury Theatre on the AirThe MGM Theater of the AirScreen Director's PlayhouseThe Screen Guild TheaterStars over HollywoodSuspenseThe United States Steel Hour''

References

External links
Academy Award article and log
Dick Judge episode log
Jerry Haendiges Vintage Radio Logs: Academy Award
Zoot Radio, Free Academy Award Theater radio show downloads

Listen to

1940s American radio programs
American radio dramas
1946 radio programme debuts
1946 radio programme endings
CBS Radio programs
Radio programs based on works
Radio programmes based on novels
Radio programs based on films
Anthology radio series